Village Life is an album by jazz pianist Herbie Hancock and Mandinka griot Foday Musa Suso, recorded in Japan and released in 1985. Hancock and Suso had worked together as part of a larger ensemble for Hancock's 1984 album Sound-System, and Village Live was recorded shortly after a world tour. There are no overdubs, Village Life was recorded live in the studio.

Track listing
 "Moon/Light" (Hancock, Suso) - 7:57
 "Ndan Ndan Nyaria" (Suso) - 9:50
 "Early Warning" (Hancock) - 2:52
 "Kanatente" (Hancock, Suso) - 19:59

Personnel 
Musicians
Herbie Hancock - detunable Yamaha DX1 synthesizer, Yamaha RX-11 drum machine programming
Foday Musa Suso - kora, talking drum, vocals

Production
Herbie Hancock - producer
Bill Laswell - producer
Tony Meilandt - associate producer

Dave Jerden - engineer (recording)
Tomoo Suzuki - engineer (recording)
Tetsuro Tomita - engineer (digital editing)
Wally Traugott - engineer (mastering)
Nobuhisa Kawabe - assistant engineer
Shinichi Miyoshi - assistant engineer

Adam's Dad Management Co. - management
David Rubinson - management
Prince Twin-Seven Seven - cover illustration
Geoffrey Thomas - photography
Roger Steffens - liner notes

References

1985 albums
Columbia Records albums
Herbie Hancock albums
Foday Musa Suso albums
albums produced by Bill Laswell